This is a list of Czech painters.

A

Miroslav Adámek
Mikoláš Aleš
Jiří Anderle
Jaroslav Augusta
Jan Autengruber

B

Karel Balcar
Lojza Baránek
Vojtěch Bartoněk
Břetislav Bartoš
Viktor Barvitius
Jan Bauch
Alois Beer
Josef Konstantin Beer
Jaroslav Benda
Karel Benedík
Vincenc Beneš
Dagmar Berková
František Bílkovský
Oldřich Blažíček
Josef Bolf
Adolf Born
Josef Bosáček
Václav Boštík
Vladimír Boudník
Petr Brandl
Zdenka Braunerová
Oskar Brázda
Jaroslav Brožek
Václav Brožík
Vratislav Hugo Brunner
Alois Bubák
Zdeněk Burian
Jan Burka

C

Josef Čapek
František Ringo Čech
Jaroslav Čermák
Jaroslav Černý
Josef Černý
Věnceslav Černý
František Chalupa
Antonín Chittussi
Tomáš Císařovský
Alfons von Czibulka

D

Alén Diviš
Čeněk Dobiáš
Václav Dosbaba
Hana Dostalová
František Roman Dragoun
Valentin Držkovic
Josef Dubiel von LeRach
Jan Dungel
Ferdiš Duša
Jiří Dvořák
Bohumír Dvorský

E

Zvonimír Eichler

F

Josef Fanta
Bedřich Feigl
Stanislav Feikl
Josef Fiala

Emil Filla
Hugo Anton Fisher
Luma von Flesch-Brunningen  
Jan Florian
Viktor Foerster
Karel Franta
Vladimír Franz

Emanuel Salomon Friedberg-Mírohorský

G

František Gellner
Norbert Grund

H

Jan Kryštof Handke
Jan František Händl

 Bedřich Havránek
Jan Jiří Heinsch
Josef Vojtěch Hellich

Josef Hlinomaz

Vlastislav Hofman

František Horčička

Helga Hošková-Weissová

Antonín Hudeček

Jakub Husník
Vojtěch Hynais

J

Jan Quirin Jahn

Václav Jansa

Karel Javůrek

František Cína Jelínek
Jiří Jelínek

Felix Jenewein
Jakub Jerabek
Miloš Jiránek

Vojtěch Benedikt Juhn
Václav Junek
Alfréd Justitz

K

Dusan Kadlec

Vilém Kandler

Adolf Kašpar
František Kaván

Karel Klíč

Jan Konůpek
Adolf Kosárek
Jan Kotěra
Jan Kotík

Josef Kramolín

Jan Křesadlo
Jiří Kroha

Ludvík Kuba
Vojtěch Kubašta
Otakar Kubín
Bohumil Kubišta

Oldřich Kulhánek
Jan Kupecký
František Kupka
Petr Kvíčala

L

Josef Lada

Otakar Lebeda
Felix Ivo Leicher

Antonín Lhota
Kamil Lhoták

Adolf Liebscher
Karel Liebscher
Josef Liesler
Emanuel Krescenc Liška
Jan Kryštof Liška

M

Vincenc Makovský

Antonín Mánes
Josef Mánes
Quido Mánes
Amalie Mánesová
Julius Mařák

Luděk Marold

Herbert Masaryk

Jan Matulka
Mikuláš Medek

Alfons Mucha

František Muzika

N

František Mořic Nágl

Josef Matěj Navrátil

Augustin Němejc

Vladimír Novák

Jan Nowopacký

O

Jakub Obrovský

Viktor Oliva

Emil Orlík
Eduard Ovčáček

P

Milan Peric

Ivo Pešák
August Bedřich Piepenhagen
Charlotte Piepenhagen-Mohr

Soběslav Pinkas
Maximilian Pirner

Otto Placht

 Miluše Poupětová
Jan Preisler
Vojtěch Preissig

Antonín Procházka
Jaro Procházka

Jindřich Prucha
Karel Purkyně

R

Ignác Raab

Václav Radimský
Josef Jáchym Redelmayer
Václav Vavřinec Reiner

Zdeněk Rykr
Jaroslav Róna

S

Joseph Ignatz Sadler

Jakub Schikaneder

Hanuš Schwaiger 
Vojtěch Sedláček

Otakar Sedloň
Alfred Seifert

Jaroslav Šerých

Josef Šíma
T. F. Šimon

František Skála

Karel Škréta

Antonín Slavíček

Václav Špála

Karel Štěch

Jitka Štenclová

Max Švabinský
Karel Svoboda

T

František Tkadlík

Jan Trampota
Jiří Trnka
Václav Turek

U

Joža Uprka

V

Vladimír Vašíček

Martin Velíšek

Jaroslav Věšín

Jan Vilímek
František Vláčil

Jan Antonín Vocásek

W

Alois Wachsman
Bedřich Wachsmann
Josef Wagner the Younger
Karel Wellner
Vilém Wünsche

Z

Adolf Zábranský
Ladislav Žák
Josef Zelený
František Ženíšek
Stanislav Zippe
Karel Zlín
Jan Zrzavý
Vladimír Županský
František Bohumír Zvěřina

See also

 Czech art
 List of Czech artists by date
 List of Czech women artists
 List of lists of painters by nationality

 
Painters
Czech